Lázaro Raydel Fundora Travieso (born ) is a Cuban male volleyball player who plays for Serbian team Vojvodina. He is part of the Cuba men's national volleyball team.

References

External links
 profile at FIVB.org

1994 births
Living people
Cuban men's volleyball players
Place of birth missing (living people)